Parentis-en-Born is a commune in the Landes department in Nouvelle-Aquitaine in southwestern France.

It has one of the biggest oil reserves of continental western Europe. The Biscarrosse – Parentis Airport is located in the commune.

Population

See also
Communes of the Landes department
Lac de Biscarrosse et de Parentis

References

Lac de Biscarrosse et de Parentis

Parentisenborn